Dyrehaven (Danish 'The Deer Park'), officially Jægersborg Dyrehave, is a forest park north of Copenhagen. Dyrehaven is noted for its mixture of huge, ancient oak trees and large populations of red and fallow deer. In July 2015, it was one of the three forests included in the UNESCO World Heritage Site inscribed as Par force hunting landscape in North Zealand.

All entrances to the park have a characteristic red gate; one of the most popular entrances is Klampenborg gate, close to Klampenborg station. All the entrance gates have an identical gate house attached to them, which serve as the residences of the forest wardens. Dyrehaven is maintained as a natural forest, with the emphasis on the natural development of the woods over commercial forestry. Old trees are felled only if they are a danger to the public. It has herds of about 2100 deer in total, with 300 Red Deer, 1700 Fallow Deer and 100 Sika Deer. Dyrehaven is also the venue for the Hermitage road race (Eremitageløbet) and the yearly Hubertus hunt (Hubertusjagten) which is held on the first Sunday in November. In former times it was home to the Fortunløbet race, later known as Ermelundsløbet, but this race was discontinued in 1960.

History
In 1669 Frederik III decided that the wood of "Boveskov" ("Beech wood") should be fenced in and wild deer from the surrounding areas driven into the newly created park. Boveskov was already well known as the former property of Valdemar the Victorious as it had been recorded in his census (the Liber Census Daniæ) of 1231. The forest lay in the westerly and southerly part of the present Dyrehaven and encompassed land used by the farmers from the village of Stokkerup, which lay to the north. Fencing work consisted of excavating a ditch, the earth from which was built up in a bank on the outside walls of the ditch, on the opposite side to the centre of the park. On the top of the bank posts were driven into the ground and fences installed. This made it more difficult for the deer to leap the fence, as the rise between the ditch and the bank effectively increased the level of the fence. The ditch and bank can still be seen for a long stretch in the south-easterly part of the current park. The work was never finished, as Frederik III died in 1670. The design, however, is still on record, and the area for the scheme worked out at around 3 square kilometres. When Frederik's son, Christian V, became king, he laid out new and more ambitious plans for Dyrehaven.

During his education Christian V had spent time at the court of Louis XIV in France. Here he had seen another type of hunting practice, parforce (hunting with dogs), that he wished to adopt. This style of hunting required a greater area of land for its practice, so Christian V increased the boundaries to include the fields up to the village of Stokkerup (the area known today as Eremitagesletten), as well as taking in the land that today is Jægersborg Hegn. The inhabitants of Stokkerup, whose village pond still lies within Eremitagesletten area, were ordered to tear down their houses and make use of the materials to rebuild the farms in the area that had stood empty since the Northern Wars. They were compensated for this by having a period of three years during which they were exempt from taxation.

Areas in Dyrehaven

Eremitagesletten

Eremitagesletten is an area in the north of the park. Originally this area was the fields of the village of Stokkerup, but was enclosed when Christian needed it for hunting with dogs. Evidence of this can be clearly seen from the roads which are laid out in the classic star form that was typical for areas used in this form of hunting. In the middle of Eremitagesletten is the Hermitage, built during the reign of Christian VI.

Eremitagesletten is encircled by forest. From Hjortekær to the north and the east there is a row of chestnut trees that make up the boundaries of the plain. This row of trees marked the northern extent of Dyrehaven until 1913, when the boundaries were extended north of Mølleåen.

Mølleåen
This is an area north of Eremitagesletten near Rådvad along the banks of the Millstream.

Fortunens Indelukke
Fortunens Indelukke is an area in the west of Dyrehaven. It is fenced in and is the only part of the forest that the deer do not have access to.
There are a few other areas also fenced in, but only smaller and temporary to save the young trees.

Ulvedalene

Ulvedalene has Dyrehaven's hilliest terrain, which was created during the last ice age. Djævlebakken, a popular sledging run is found in this part of the park. Ulvedalsteateret (Ulvedal theatre) gave performances for 39 years in Ulvedalene. The first time was in the summer of 1910 with Adam Gottlob Oehlenschläger's Hagbart and Signe. The idea originated from the actor Adam Poulsen and producer Henrik Cavling. The architect Jens Ferdinand Willumsen created spaces for about 4,000 sitting and 2,000 standing spectators, which made it possible to lower the ticket price to an accessible level. The theatre survived up to 1949, and after a break of almost 50 years, the tradition was revived by Birgitte Price with an arrangement of Johan Ludvig Heiberg's Elverhøj in 1996 in a production supported by the Royal Danish Theatre, Lyngby-Taarbæk Kommune and Kulturby'96. Since then there have been further performances, the latest, Røde Orm, in 2018. In 2020, a play based on J. R. R. Tolkien's The Hobbit was planned, but due to the COVID-19 pandemic, it has been pushed out to 2021.

Von Langens Plantage
This is the southernmost part of Dyrehaven and the most visited.

Dyrehavsbakken
Dyrehavsbakken (colloquially Bakken and literally in English "The Deer Park's Hill") is the world's oldest existing amusement park.

Kirsten Piils Kilde

Kirsten Piils Kilde (Kirsten Piil's Spring) was discovered in 1583 by Kirsten Piil about whom little is known. Legend states Kirsten was a pious woman, who, through her devotion, gave the spring curative powers, which made it a place of pilgrimage for the sick who would come to drink the water.

Peter Lieps Hus
Peter Lieps Hus (Peter Liep's House) is now a well-known restaurant. It is named after Dyrehaven's first sharpshooter, Peter Liep. The house was originally called Kildehuset (Spring house) and is thought to have been to be built towards the end of the 18th century. In the 1860s a two-storey extension was added that gave the house a clumsy appearance. Peter Liep took over the building in 1888. In September 1915 the house burned to the ground, but it was reconstructed by 1916. In 1928 the house burned down again. It was rebuilt to a different design, basically as it can be seen today. After some years a pavilion and toilets were added. Visitor numbers consistently rose (the house had already achieved a good reputation as a restaurant by the end of the 19th century). In 1952 a fire again broke out in the house. The fire was extinguished before it did any major damage: a hole was burned in the thatched roof, but later the same day the extensions caught fire and burned down, and only the main farmhouse was able to be saved. The extensions were rebuilt in 1954 and a new pavilion added in 1960. All these buildings are today known under the collective name "Peter Lieps Hus", though the house is very different from the house Peter Liep lived in on the same spot.

Fortunen

Fortunen (The Fortune) is a former ranger station on the King's hunting road to Dyrehaven, named after the Roman goddess of luck Fortuna. It is now home to a hotel and restaurant.

Annual events
 Eremitage race
 Day of the Kite

Hubertus Hunt

The Hubertus Hunt is a cross country horse race which takes place every year on the first Sunday in November, marking the end of the hunting season. First held in 1900, the event attracts about 160 riders and up to 40,000 spectators. The race always begins at Peter Liep's House and involves a break at the Hermitage Lodge. The race route is 13 km long and involves a total of 35 obstacles. The winner receives the Hubertus chain.

Open air theatre
The Royal Danish Theatre produces an annual theatre production at Ulvedalene in Jægersborg Dyrehave.

References 

Lyngby-Bogen 1989 / red. Jeppe Tønsberg. Udgivet af Historisk-Topografisk Selskab for Lyngby-Taarbæk Kommune
"Dyrehaven" af Torben Christiansen og Peter Lassen, Politikens Forlag, 2005. 
Meulengracht-Madsen, Jens: "Dyrehavens gamle ege, deres alder og vækst", Naturens Verden, nr. 11-12/1999, vol. 82, side 2-21.

External links
 The Parforce Hunting landscape in North Zealand UNESCO
Jægersborg Dyrehave, Skov- og Naturstyrelsen, Vandreture i Statsskovene nr. 22
Dyrehaven, Mattssons Rideklub
Ravnene (skulpturer fra scenen ved Ulvedalene)

Parks and open spaces in Gentofte Municipality
Parks and open spaces in Lyngby-Taarbæk Municipality
Forests of Greater Copenhagen
Urban forests in Denmark
Tourist attractions in the Capital Region of Denmark
Danish Culture Canon
World Heritage Sites in Denmark
Articles containing video clips